Alf Stamp is a former football (soccer) player who represented New Zealand at international level.

Stamp played four official full internationals for New Zealand in June and July 1979, making his debut as a substitute in a 0–1 loss to Australia on 13 June. He played two games against Fiji before gaining his final cap, also as a substitute in a 2–0 win over Australia on 23 July.

References 

Year of birth missing (living people)
Living people
New Zealand association footballers
New Zealand international footballers
Association football wingers
Queen's Park F.C. players
Eastern Suburbs AFC players
Partick Thistle F.C. players
Newcastle KB United players